Abu Mohammed Abd as-Salam al-Qadiri (1648–1698) was an historian and genealogist of the Sharifian families of Morocco. He was the grandfather and precursor of the historian Mohammed al-Qadiri (1713–80). He wrote a book about Ahmad ibn Abdullah al-Ma'n al-Andalusi, entitled Al-Maksad al-ahmad fi l-tarif bi-Sayyidina Ibn Abd Allah. He was an expert in the field of lexicography, logic, rhetoric, and hadith.

References

17th-century Moroccan historians
Moroccan lexicographers
1648 births
1698 deaths
Moroccan genealogists
People from Fez, Morocco